Salum may refer to:
Salum, Argyll and Bute, a location in Scotland
Sallum or As Sallum, a harbour city in Egypt, near the border to Libya
Saloum, a former kingdom in present-day Senegal
Salum Air Base, a former Iraqi Air Force base in the Diyala Governorate of Iraq

People with the name
 Ikaji Salum (born 1967), Tanzanian long-distance runner
 Salum Swedi (born 1980), Tanzanian footballer